Henry III, Lord of Waldeck ( – 1267) was a German nobleman.  He was the eldest son of Count Adolph I of Waldeck and Schwalenberg (d. 1270), from his first marriage with Sophie (d. 1254).

Life 
Henry was already a co-ruler of Waldeck during his father's lifetime.  However, he died three years before his father, so he never inherited the county.  His younger brother Widukind had joined the clergy, and was Bishop of Osnabrück from 1265 until his death on 18 November 1269.  Consequently, Adolph I was succeeded by Henry III's son Adolph II.

Henry III, his father and his brother Widukind supported Landgrave Henry I of Hesse in his struggle with Bishop Simon I of Paderborn and abbot Henry III of Corvey, about territorial dominance in the border region between Hesse and Westphalia.  Henry I prevailed.

Marriage and issue 
Henry was married to Matilda of Cuyk-Arnsberg ( – 13 August 1298).  She was a daughter of Count Gottfried III of Arnsberg and heiress of Wewelsburg.  Together, they had the following children:
 Adolph II ( – 13 December 1302), he was Count of Waldeck from 1270 to 1276; then he abdicated and joined the clergy.  In 1301, he became Bishop of Liège
 Gottfried (d. 14 May 1324), bishop of Minden from 1304 until his death
 Otto I (d. 11 November 1305), succeeded Adolph II in 1276 as Count of Waldeck
 Adelaide (d. ), married Simon I of Lippe (d. 1344)

External links 
 Entry at Genealogie-Mittelalter.de

Counts of Waldeck
13th-century births
Year of birth uncertain
1267 deaths
13th-century German nobility